Felismina Cavela (born August 24, 1992 in Kasonge, Cuanza Sul) is an Angolan middle-distance runner. At the 2012 Summer Olympics, she competed in the Women's 800 metres.

References

1992 births
Living people
Angolan female middle-distance runners
Olympic athletes of Angola
Athletes (track and field) at the 2012 Summer Olympics